Acanthocephalus is a genus of plants in the family Asteraceae, described as a genus in 1842.

The genus is native to Central Asia.

 Species
 Acanthocephalus amplexifolius Kar. & Kir. - Altai
 Acanthocephalus benthamianus Regel & Schmalh. - Uzbekistan

Etymology 
The genus name is a contraction of the Greek ἄκανθα (akantha) meaning "thorn" or "prickle", and κεφαλή (kephale), the word for "head".

References

Bibliography

External links 

Cichorieae
Asteraceae genera
Flora of Central Asia